Liptena tiassale, the Tiassale liptena, is a butterfly in the family Lycaenidae. It is found in Ivory Coast and Ghana. The habitat consists of open forests.

References

Butterflies described in 1969
Liptena